Whites is an unincorporated community in Grays Harbor County, in the U.S. state of Washington.

History
A post office called Whites was established in 1913, and remained in operation until 1949. The community was named after Allen White, the proprietor of a local sawmill.

References

Unincorporated communities in Grays Harbor County, Washington
Unincorporated communities in Washington (state)